Acacia vestita, also known as weeping boree, weeping acacia, and hairy wattle, is a shrub and small tree native to New South Wales, Australia.

Description
It flowers from about August to October. It can be propagated by seed, which may be first soaked in hot water to permeate the hard seed coating before planting.

Gardens 
Acacia vestita is grown in the horticulture industry as a small multi-trunk tree for gardens, and is popular in California for drought tolerant landscaping.

References

vestita
Fabales of Australia
Flora of New South Wales
Garden plants of Australia
Drought-tolerant trees
Ornamental trees